Poeciloxestia is a genus of beetles in the family Cerambycidae, containing the following species:

 Poeciloxestia bivittata (Buquet, 1852)
 Poeciloxestia carlyslei Fragoso, 1978
 Poeciloxestia coriacea Martins & Monne, 2005
 Poeciloxestia dorsalis (Thomson, 1860)
 Poeciloxestia elegans (Gory, 1833)
 Poeciloxestia hirsutiventris Fragoso, 1978
 Poeciloxestia lanceolata Fragoso, 1978
 Poeciloxestia lanei Fragoso, 1978
 Poeciloxestia lateralis (Erichson, 1847)
 Poeciloxestia melzeri Lane, 1965
 Poeciloxestia minuta Fragoso, 1978
 Poeciloxestia ochrotaenia (Bates, 1870)
 Poeciloxestia paraensis Lane, 1965
 Poeciloxestia parallela Fragoso, 1978
 Poeciloxestia plagiata (Waterhouse, 1880)
 Poeciloxestia rugosicollis Fragoso, 1978
 Poeciloxestia sagittaria (Bates, 1872)
 Poeciloxestia signatipennis (Melzer, 1923)
 Poeciloxestia suturalis (Perty, 1832)
 Poeciloxestia travassosi Fragoso, 1978

References

 
Cerambycidae genera